Manitowish is an unincorporated community located within the town of Mercer, Iron County, Wisconsin, United States. It is located at the junction of U.S. Route 51, Wisconsin Highway 47 and Wisconsin Highway 182.

History

A post office called Manitowish was established in 1890, and remained in operation until it was discontinued in 1968. The community took its name from the nearby Manitowish River.

References

External links

Unincorporated communities in Iron County, Wisconsin
Unincorporated communities in Wisconsin